is a Japanese photographer best known for his black-and-white street photography and association with the avant-garde photography magazine Provoke. 

Moriyama began his career as an assistant to photographer Eikoh Hosoe, a co-founder of the avant-garde photo cooperative Vivo, and made his mark with his first photobook Japan: A Photo Theater, published in 1968. His formative work in the 1960s boldly captured the darker qualities of urban life in postwar Japan in rough, unfettered fashion, filtering the rawness of human experience through sharply tilted angles, grained textures, harsh contrast, and blurred movements through the photographer's wandering gaze. Many of his well-known works from the 1960s and 1970s are read through the lenses of post-war reconstruction and post-Occupation cultural upheaval.

Moriyama continued to experiment with the representative possibilities offered by the camera in his 1969 Accident series, which was serialized over one year in the photo magazine Asahi Camera, in which he deployed his camera as a kind of copying machine to reproduce existing media images. His 1972 photobook Farewell Photography, which was accompanied by an interview with his fellow Provoke photographer Takuma Nakahira, presents his radical effort to dismantle the medium.

Although the photobook is a favored format of presentation among Japanese photographers, Moriyama was particularly prolific: he has produced more than 150 photobooks since 1968. His creative career has been honored by a number of solo exhibitions by major institutions, along with his two-person exhibition with William Klein at Tate Modern in 2012-13. He received the Hasselblad Award in 2019, among other prestigious awards.

Biography

Early life and career beginnings 
Moriyama was born in Ikeda, Osaka in 1938. After abandoning a career in design, Moriyama began to shoot photography during his early 20s using an inexpensive Canon IV Sb purchased from a friend. In Osaka, Moriyama studied photography under Takeji Iwamiya before moving to Tokyo in 1961 to connect with the radical photography collective Vivo, whose work he admired. He eventually found work as an assistant to photographer and Vivo member Eikoh Hosoe, a position he remained in for three years. After training in studios, he shifted to taking street photography in his late 20s. As a young man coming of age in 1950s and '60s, Moriyama bore witness to the political unrest (illustrated most vividly in the 1960 Anpo protests), economic revival and mass consumerism, and radical art-making that characterized the two decades following the end of World War II. His first photobook, Nippon gekijō shashinchō (にっぽん劇場写真帖, Japan: A Photo Theater), published in 1968, captures the excitement, tension, anxiety, and rage of urban life during this critical historical juncture through a collection of images, indiscriminate in subject matter, presented in dizzying succession through full-page spreads. The photographs range from ordinary streetscapes featuring blurred faces and garish signage to snapshots alluding to the aggressive redevelopment taking place in Tokyo and the rubble left in its wake, as well as images of nightlife and darker elements of urban life. As the title of the photobook suggests, Moriyama's approach hones in on the spectacle of everyday life, in all its ugliness and splendor.

Provoke (1969-70) 

In 1965, a series of photographs of preserved human embryos, titled 'Mugon geki' ('Silent Theatre'), by Moriyama were published in the magazine Gendai no me and caught the attention of avant-garde poet Shūji Terayama. Terayama commissioned Moriyama to provide accompanying images for his experimental theatre and prose works, providing Moriyama with a boost in his early career and connecting him to other avant-garde creatives including Tadanori Yokoo and Takuma Nakahira. His connection to Nakahira, a founding member of the photography magazine Provoke, eventually led to his participation in the publication beginning with the second issue in 1969.

Moriyama is largely known for his work associated with the short-lived but deeply influential magazine, which was founded by photographers Takuma Nakahira and Yutaka Takanishi, along with critic Kōji Taki and writer Takahiko Okada in 1968. The publication popularized the "are, bure, bokeh" style, translated as "grainy/rough, blurry, and out-of-focus," an aesthetic rebuttal to the dominant European-style photojournalism style (exemplified by Ken Domon's realist approach) and straightforward commercial work that dominated the Japanese photography scene at the time. These visions of everyday life rejected the notion that photography captures a lucid reflection of the world undergirded by a legible ideological argument; rather, they sought to emphasize the fragmentary nature of reality and make evident the photographer's prowling, wandering gaze. Eroticism and masculinized subjectivity are often associated with the aesthetic of the magazine.

As stated in the magazine's 1968 manifesto, "[T]he images [eizō] themselves are not ideas. They do not possess the wholeness of concepts, neither are they a communicative code like language....But this irreversible materiality [hikagyakuteki bussitsusei] – reality cut off from the camera – constitutes the reverse side of the world defined by language; and for this reason, [the image] is at times able to provoke the world of language and ideas." Provoke sought to assert photography's role in producing a phenomenological encounter that focused on the bodily and the immediate, moving beyond preconceived notions of truth, reality, and vision to probe questions surrounding the identity of photographic matter and the roles of the photographer, subject, and viewer. Though the collective only produced three issues and a book, First, Abandon the World of Pseudocertainty – Thoughts on Photography and Language (1970), each member continued to publicize their work in close relation to the "era of Provoke," and the magazine has had an immense cultural impact and been the subject of numerous international exhibitions.

Akushidento (Accident) (1969) 
In 1968, Moriyama began producing a series focused on the theme of "equivalence" using images featured in mass media as his source material. According to Moriyama, the series was prompted by an experience he had at a train terminal in Tokyo, whereupon he was shocked to see the news of Robert F. Kennedy's assassination on the front page of newspapers scattered all around him. Taking interest in the mediated nature of press images, Moriyama says in an interview with Nakahira that this encounter prompted him to become "determined to negate the values that are attached to one single photograph." Moriyama photographed images reproduced from different mass media, including a television still of Lyndon B. Johnson announcing the suspension of the bombing of North Vietnam, newswire shots of Richard Nixon shortly after winning the presidential election, and the corpses of brutally killed Vietcong soldiers, along with the aforementioned image of Robert F. Kennedy. Moriyama treated the camera as a device that copies reality and thus produces "equivalents," rendering insignificant the distance that the original photographs, the endlessly reproduced press images, and Moriyama's own versions have from the initial event. The twelve-part series was published in Asahi Camera alongside his own texts, where he describes the unpredictability of fate and the precariousness of human experience, believing that the camera has the capacity to reveal the "possibility of tragedy [that] has somehow seeped into the surrounding environment."

Shashin yo sayōnara (Farewell Photography) (1972) 
Published in April 1972, Shashin yo sayōnara ("Farewell Photography") emerged within the context of Japan's aggressive cultural and economic revival—best exemplified in the creative sphere by Expo '70—and continued suppression of left-wing politics, as illustrated by the failure of the 1970 Anpo protests and the subsequent renewal of the United States-Japan Security Treaty. The photobook, as suggested by the title, takes a nihilistic turn from his prior work, turning its attention towards the incidental and evocative nature of photography rather than the visual subject itself. The images highlight the physical detritus of the photographic process, such as the edges of discarded film, flecks of dust, and light leaks, along with the material dimensions of image-making as evidenced through the sprocket holes on negative strips and the brand names of the film, challenging the indexical relationship between photographer, camera, and image and the established conventions of viewing photographs as referents of reality.

His photography production waned during the mid to late-1970s, owing to depression, drug use, and creative stasis, but he returned to the public eye with the series Hikari to Kage (Light and Shadow) in the magazine Shashinjidai in 1981. He has continued to shoot commercial and artistic work over the decades both in and outside of Japan, and is one of the most active and prolific contemporary photographers in Japan.

Influences 
Moriyama's photography has been influenced by Seiryū Inoue, Shōmei Tōmatsu, William Klein, Andy Warhol, Eikoh Hosoe, Yukio Mishima, Shūji Terayama and Jack Kerouac's On the Road. Inspired by the liberatory and indeterminate qualities of Sal Paradise's journey, Moriyama similarly embarked on a solo road trip across Japan, borrowing a friend's old Toyota and capturing photographs along the trip that would become the basis for Karyudo ("A Hunter") (1972).

Format 
Moriyama often presents his work in the form of photobooks, which he describes as open-ended sites, allowing the reader to decide on the sequence of images that they view. Since 1968, he has published more than 150 photobooks. He has cited his preference for having a third party work on the formatting and recomposition of the images, as it frees him from the influences of his own memory and filters the images through the eye of an outsider. A collection of Moriyama's writings, compiled from a fifteen-part series published in Asahi Camera beginning in 1983, have been published as an autobiographical photobook titled Inu no kioku ("Memories of a Dog").

Color and digital work 
While Moriyama is most recognized for his black and white film photography, he has been shooting with color since the 1970s, and since the late 2000s has turned increasingly to compact digital photography, now working almost exclusively in this medium. In 1970, he helped produce the Asahi Journal's new color photography series Dai go shōgen ("The Fifth Quadrant") and published photo essays on new development projects in Osaka and Tokyo, cherry blossoms in Osaka, and American military base towns in the Kantō region. These projects employed his unconventional framing styles along with white balance and color exposure distortions that enhanced the uncanny, unsettling features of the world around him.

Due to his tendency to take a large number of shots when photographing, Moriyama finds the digital format more amenable to his needs, and rejects critics who fixate on the preciousness of film photography. In response to a question posted by writer Takeshi Nakamoto's regarding Moriyama's advice for beginner street photographers, Moriyama states, "Get outside. It’s all about getting out and walking. That’s the first thing. The second thing is, forget everything you’ve learned on the subject of photography for the moment, and just shoot. Take photographs—of anything and everything, whatever catches your eye. Don’t pause to think."

The solo exhibition Daido Tokyo at Fondation Cartier pour l’art Contemporain, Paris in 2016 was the first major solo show to display his color photographs. Between 2008 and 2015, Moriyama revisited Tokyo, with a focus on the Shinjuku district—where much of his early career was spent—to take 86 chromogenic prints ("Tokyo Colour" series, 2008–2015) and black-and-white photographs ("Dog and Mesh Tights," 2014–2015).

Awards

1967: New Artist Award from the Japan Photo Critics Association
1983: Annual Award from the Photographic Society of Japan
2003: The 44th Mainichi Art Award
2004: The Cultural Award from the German Society for Photography (DGPh)
2012: Infinity Award, Lifetime Achievement category, International Center of Photography, New York
2018: Ordre des Arts et des Lettres, Chevalier
2019: Hasselblad Foundation International Award in Photography
2020: Asahi Prize

Select publications

Magazines by Moriyama
Record No.1. Self-published, 1972.
Record No.2. Self-published, 1972.
Record No.3. Self-published, 1972.
Record No.4. Self-published, 1973.
Record No.5. Self-published, 1973.
Record No.6. – Record No.39. Tokyo: Akio Nagasawa, 2006–2018. Various individual editions.

Publications with others
4. Mazu tashikarashisa no sekai o sutero: shashin to gengo no shisō = First Abandon the World of Pseudo-Certainty: Thoughts on Photography and Language. Tokyo: Tabata Shoten, 1970. . With Nakahira Takuma, Takanashi Yutaka and Taki Kōji.
 The Japanese Box – Facsimile reprint of six rare photographic publications of the Provoke era, Edition 7L / Göttingen: Steidl, 2001.
Terayama. Tokyo: Match and Company Co., 2015. English and Japanese editions. With text by Shuji Terayama and an afterword by Satoshi Machiguchi, "The Spell Moves On." 
Dazai. MMM label 5. Tokyo: Match and Company Co., 2014. With a text by Osamu Dazai, "Villon's Wife." 
Odasaku. Tokyo: Match and Company Co., 2016. With a short story by Sakunosuke Oda, "At the Horse Races," and an afterword by Satoshi Machiguchi.
Teppo yuri no Shateikyori. Tokyo: Getsuyosha, 2017. With haiku in Japanese by Misa Uchida.
Witness #2 (Number Two): Daido Moriyama. Portland: Nazraeli, 2007. By Moriyama, Emi Anrakuji, and Ken Kitano. .

Select solo exhibitions

Source:

Further reading
 From Postwar to Postmodern : Art in Japan 1945-1989 : Primary Documents. Edited by Doryun Chong. New York: Museum of Modern Art, 2012. 
 Fujii, Yuko. “Photography as Process: A Study of the Japanese Photography Journal Provoke”. PhD Diss., The City University of New York, 2012.
 Moriyama, Daidō, and Gabriel Bauret. Daido Moriyama. London: Thames & Hudson, 2012.
 Moriyama, Daidō. Daido Moriyama. Paris: Fondation Cartier pour l’art contemporain, 2003.
 Phillips, Sandra S., Daidō Moriyama, and Alexandra Munroe. Daido Moriyama : Stray Dog. San Francisco. San Francisco: San Francisco Museum of Modern Art, 1999.
 Sas, Miryam B. Experimental Arts in Postwar Japan: Moments of Encounter, Engagement, and Imagined Return. Cambridge: Harvard University Asia Center, 2011.
 光の狩人 森山大道1965-2003. 島根県立美術館/NHKエデュケーショナル, 2003.
 Provoke: Between Protest and Performance : Photography in Japan 1960-1975. Edited by Diane Dufour, Matthew S. Witkovsky, with Duncan Forbes and Walter Moser. Göttingen: Steidl, 2016.

External links
 
 Daido Moriyama filmed interview in Tokyo – TateShots
 Moriyama's works at Tokyo Digital Museum
 Documentation of recent Moriyama exhibitions
 Daidō Moriyama at Artcyclopedia – list of exhibits and image galleries.
 Exhibition at the Centro Andaluz de Arte Contemporáneo, Seville, 2007.
 Moriyama's "Northern" series at online gallery Azito.
 shashasha photobook application – archive of Moriyama's out-of-print photobooks

References

1938 births
Living people
Japanese photographers
People from Ikeda, Osaka
Street photographers
Japanese contemporary artists
20th-century Japanese artists
20th-century photographers
21st-century Japanese artists
21st-century photographers